National Geographic Video is an educational video series founded by the National Geographic Society.

References

National Geographic Society